Shibuyunji District is a district of Central Province, Zambia.

It was first separated from Mumbwa District and transferred from Central Province to Lusaka Province in 2012 by President Michael Sata. Then, it was moved back from Lusaka Province to Central Province by President Edgar Lungu in 2018.

References 

Districts of Central Province, Zambia